The women's long jump F13 had its final held on September 12, at 17:10.

Medalists

Results

References
Final

Athletics at the 2008 Summer Paralympics
2008 in women's athletics